State elections were held in South Australia on 7 March 1953. All 39 seats in the South Australian House of Assembly were up for election. The incumbent Liberal and Country League led by Premier of South Australia Thomas Playford IV defeated the Australian Labor Party led by Leader of the Opposition Mick O'Halloran.

Background
Labor won three seats, metropolitan Norwood and Prospect and rural Victoria from the LCL. The LCL won one seat, rural Murray from Labor. Neither major party contested the independent-held seat of Ridley.

The Labor opposition won 53 percent of the statewide two-party vote, but the LCL retained government with the assistance of the Playmander − an electoral malapportionment that also saw a clear majority of the statewide two-party vote won by Labor while failing to form government in 1944, 1962 and 1968.

Results

|}

 The primary vote figures were from contested seats, while the state-wide two-party-preferred vote figures were estimated from all seats.

Post-election pendulum

See also
Results of the South Australian state election, 1953 (House of Assembly)
Candidates of the 1953 South Australian state election
Members of the South Australian House of Assembly, 1953-1956
Members of the South Australian Legislative Council, 1953-1956
Playmander

Notes

External links
Two-party preferred figures since 1950, ABC News Online

Elections in South Australia
1953 elections in Australia
1950s in South Australia
March 1953 events in Australia